Suzi Ruffell (born 18 January 1986) is a British comedian, writer, and actress.

Early life

Ruffell was born in Portsmouth to a working-class family. Her father buys and sells lorries and her mother became his assistant after raising Suzi and her older brother.

Ruffell joined a youth drama group which had a major impact on her eventual career choice. She considered Victoria Wood, Catherine Tate, Dawn French and Jennifer Saunders to be her heroes. After Chichester College, she attended drama school at the Academy of Live and Recorded Arts in London, where she first performed stand-up. Ruffell was the first in her family to attend university.

Career
Ruffell began her stand-up comedy career in November 2008 and has been performing stand-up full time since 2012.

Before she began touring as a solo performer, Ruffell had supported Alan Carr, Kevin Bridges, Josh Widdicombe, Joe Lycett, Romesh Ranganathan, and Katherine Ryan on national tours.

Ruffell's stand-up comedy tours include: Social Chameleon (toured in 2014–2015), Common (2016–2017), Keeping It Classy (2018, her first headlining tour), Nocturnal (2019), and Dance Like Everyone's Watching (2019–2020). After a year and a half hiatus due to the COVID-19 pandemic, Ruffell resumed the Dance Like Everyone's Watching tour in autumn 2021.

Keeping it Classy was recorded for Live from the BBC and aired on 11 July 2018.

In 2017, Ruffell and her friend Tom Allen performed across the UK on a double-bill tour titled Hit the Road!

In 2018, Ruffell toured Australia as a performer with the Melbourne International Comedy Festival Roadshow.

Also in 2018, she had a leading role in the short film Foreign, directed by Mark Pinkosh.

Television and radio
Ruffell's first television appearance was on BBC3's Ed Comedy Fest Live, and she has also appeared on numerous shows on Channel 4, E4, Comedy Central and Dave.

She is regularly heard on BBC Radio 4 on The Now Show and The News Quiz.

In addition to performing comedy, Ruffell has written for several television shows, including 8 Out of 10 Cats, The Last Leg, Twit of the Year, Stand Up for the Week, and Mock the Week.

Ruffell appeared with five other British female celebrities in the 2021 BBC2 documentary Womanhood, with the guests discussing the evolving status of women over the past 50 years.

Also in 2021, Ruffell was a presenter on the first two episodes of a female-led satirical news show on Comedy Central titled Yesterday, Today & The Day Before.

Podcasts
Since October 2015, Ruffell has co-hosted the podcast Like Minded Friends with comedian Tom Allen.

Starting in 2020, Ruffell has hosted the podcast Out with Suzi Ruffell.

In 2022, Ruffell became the co-host of Wine Times, with Sunday Times Wine Club Vice-President Will Lyons.

Personal life
Ruffell found school difficult and says that she became the "class clown" to hide her dyslexia. She has 4 GCSEs and an AS Level in Contemporary Dance.

Ruffell is gay. She said that she realised she was gay at the age of 14 but did not come out until she was 21. She said her parents were "absolutely fine" about her announcement. Ruffell married her partner Alice Storey in 2021. They have one child together.

Awards and nominations
Ruffell was nominated for the Leicester Mercury Comedian of the Year 2011, making it to the finals, and was awarded second place in the Latitude Festival New Act Competition 2011.

A sitcom pilot collaboration with playwright Jon Brittain in 2012 led to a nomination for the BAFTA Rocliffe New Writing Award.

In 2017, she was nominated for Chortle's Best Breakthrough Act. In 2019, she won that website's award for Best Club Comic.

In 2020, Ruffell was nominated for a British LGBT Award in the Broadcaster or Journalist category.

References

External links
  
 Chortle profile with tour dates
 

Living people
1986 births
21st-century English comedians
British women podcasters
British podcasters
British stand-up comedians
British women comedians
Lesbian comedians
Actresses from Portsmouth